Cota is a municipality and town of Colombia in the Central Savanna Province of the department of Cundinamarca.

History 
In the time before the Spanish conquest, the Bogotá savanna was inhabited by the Muisca, organized in the southern Muisca Confederation. The ruler of Bacatá (zipa) controlled Cota. The Muisca called the town Gota, which is either a personal name of derived from cota; "curl". Cota still has a surviving Muisca population.

Modern Cota was founded on November 29, 1604 by Diego Gómez de Mena.

Economy 
Cota has a small economy mainly based on agriculture; cabbage and lettuce.

Education 
Given its proximity to the Colombian capital, thanks to its quiet surroundings, many schools have settled in Cota with their facilities and venues; such as the following:

Oakland Colegio Campestre, Nuevo Gimnasio Cristiano, Colegio Refous, Colegio José Max León, Summerhill School,  colegio Gimnasio Campestre Los Sauces, Gimnasio El Portillo, Colegio Nuevo Reino de Granda, Colegio Nuestra Señora del Rosario, jardín Gimnasio Campestre El Shadai, colegio Gimnasio Campestre San Francisco de Sales  and since 2009 Cota is home for NASA´s Educational Program called Colombia Space School.

    Public schools

    I.E.D. Enrique Pardo Parra (Urban).

    I.E.D. Institute Parcels (Rural).

Born in Cota 
 Juan Pablo Forero, professional cyclist.

References 

Municipalities of Cundinamarca Department
Populated places established in 1604
1604 establishments in the Spanish Empire
Muisca Confederation
Muysccubun